The Dark is an album by American singer-songwriter Guy Clark, released in 2002.

Clark is the co-writer on all songs except his cover of the Townes Van Zandt song "Rex's Blues". The Dark is his first release without a solo composition. It also marks his return to the charts for the first time since Better Days.

Guests include Tim O'Brien and Gillian Welch.

Track listing
 "Mud" (Guy Clark, Buddy Mondlock) – 3:44
 "Arizona Star" (Rich Alves, Clark) – 3:24
 "Magnolia Wind" (Shawn Camp, Clark) – 3:49
 "Soldier's Joy, 1864" (Camp, Clark) – 3:38
 "Dancin' Days" (Clark, Steve Nelson) – 3:26
 "Homeless" (Clark, Ray Stephenson) – 4:24
 "Off the Map" (Clark, Nelson) – 3:44
 "Bag of Bones" (Clark, Gary Nicholson) – 3:28
 "She Loves to Ride Horses" (Clark, Keith Sykes) – 3:33
 "Rex's Blues" (Townes Van Zandt) – 3:10
 "Queenie's Song" (Terry Allen, Clark) – 2:38
 "The Dark" (Clark, Mondlock) – 3:49

Personnel
Guy Clark – vocals, guitar
Darrell Scott – banjo, dobro, guitar, mandolin, accordion, mandocello, bass, harmony vocals, marimbula
Verlon Thompson – guitar, harmonica, mandolin, percussion, djembe, National steel guitar, harmony vocals
Shawn Camp – fiddle
Tim O'Brien – fiddle
David Rawlings – harmony Vocals
Gillian Welch – harmony Vocals

Production notes
Gene Eichelberger – mastering
Chris Latham – engineer, mixing
Senor McGuire – photography
Sue Meyer – design

Chart performance

References

2002 albums
Guy Clark albums
Sugar Hill Records albums